Eremodothis is a genus of fungi in the family Sporormiaceae.

References

Pleosporales